The 1907 New South Wales state election involved 90 electoral districts returning one member each and was held on 10 September 1907.

Since the previous election in 1904, the Progressive Party, formerly one of the three major New South Wales political parties, had faded away. Some of its members had joined the Liberal Party, while others continued as independents. In line with general practice, those members are here given the designation "Former Progressive". Electorates previously held by the Progressive Party are marked as such.

Retiring members

Liberal
Rowland Anderson MLA (Botany)
James Ashton MLA (Goulburn)
William Dick MLA (Newcastle)
Sydney Kearney MLA (Armidale)
Broughton O'Conor MLA (Sherbrooke)
Edwin Richards MLA (Mudgee)

Independent
George Reynoldson MLA (Deniliquin)

Legislative Assembly
Sitting members are shown in bold text. Successful candidates are highlighted in the relevant colour.

See also
 Results of the 1907 New South Wales state election
 Members of the New South Wales Legislative Assembly, 1907–1910

Notes

References

1907